Mohan Agashe (born 23 July 1947) is an Indian psychiatrist and actor. He was awarded the Sangeet Natak Akademi Award in 1996 in theatre.

Early life
Agashe was born in Bhor, Maharashtra. He studied in B. J. Medical College, Pune for his MBBS and MD degree in Psychiatry. He later became a professor, before becoming an actor.

Career

Medicine
Agashe served as a professor of Psychiatry at the B. J. Medical College and Sassoon Hospital in Pune. Apart from his medical career, he also worked in the fields of clinical psychology and psychopharmacology. Agashe was also instrumental in establishing the Maharashtra Institute of Mental Health in 1991, a state level training and research institute in Mental Health Sciences, located in Pune, India. Agashe headed the five-year study on the trauma of the 1993 Latur earthquake, initiated by the Indian Council of Medical Research.

Agashe started his early career by opting to work in a government Hospital at Pune. He also chaired the organising committee meetings for the Annual National Conference of Indian Psychiatric Society held at Armed Forces Medical College, Pune. In 1998, Agashe's project to improve mental health education and service led to the formation of a new policy on mental education by the Government of Maharashtra. He has also served as an Advisor to the Government of Maharashtra on Mental Health Education and Service. Agashe is presently Principal Investigator for an Indo–US joint project on Cultural Disorders of Fatigue and Weaknesses.

Acting
Agashe started out as a theatre artist through Sai Paranjape's children's play. His love of acting made him take time out of his busy schedule to work in plays. He started his career in acting by working in the theatre. From April 1997 to April 2002, he was the Director General of the Film and Television Institute of India, Pune. He was part of a play called Jara Samjhun Ghya, which he presented for IMA's awareness drive to strength doctor-patient relationship in Pune. In 2018, he was also part of a Harry Potter spoof video by Bharatiya Digital Party, where he portrayed Bumbledore. He was also part of a short film #PuranaPyaar, by Gorilla Shorts.

Filmography

Films

Television

Plays 
 Daakghar
 Dhanya MI Kritarth
 Ashi Pakhare Yeti
 Ghashiram Kotval
 Katkon Trikon

Short films

Awards and nominations

References

External links

 

Indian male film actors
Male actors in Hindi cinema
Male actors in Marathi cinema
Indian male stage actors
Living people
Recipients of the Sangeet Natak Akademi Award
Male actors in Marathi theatre
1947 births
Recipients of the Padma Shri in arts
Male actors from Pune
20th-century Indian male actors
21st-century Indian male actors
Recipients of the Cross of the Order of Merit of the Federal Republic of Germany
Producers who won the Best Feature Film National Film Award
Indian psychiatrists
Filmfare Marathi Awards winners
Male actors in Marathi television